Joan Puigcercós (born 2 December 1966 in Ripoll, Spain) is a Spanish Catalan politician who had served as president of the Republican Left of Catalonia (2008–2011). He studied philosophy and political science at the UAB.

Civic background
He was a member of the Sports and Wealth Club in Ripoll, where he acted as president of youth area between 1986 and 1988.

Political background
Joan Puigcercós was affiliated with Independentistes dels Països Catalans (Independentists of the Catalan Countries) between 1983 and 1985, and with Crida a la Solidaritat (Call to Solidarity) between 1985 and 1987. He was member of the Assemblea d’Estudiants Independentistes d’Universitat (Assembly of Independentist University Students) (1984–1989).

Puigcercós joined Esquerra Republicana de Catalunya (ERC) in 1987, joining the National Executive. He also was secretary-general of the JERC between 1987 and 1994, and president of the regional division of ERC in Girona (1993–1996). From 1996 to 2001, he served as vice secretary-general of ERC. In the 24th National Congress, held in Lleida 3 and 4 July 2004, he was elected secretary-general of ERC. On 7 June 2008, he was elected president of the party, succeeding Josep-Lluís Carod-Rovira. He was succeeded as secretary general by Joan Ridao i Martín.

Joan Puigcercós is a member of the Josep Irla Foundation Patronate.

Institutional background
Councillor in Ripoll Town Council (1987–1991).
Deputy of the Catalan Parliament (1992–2000).
He represented Barcelona in the Spanish Congress from 2000 until 2004. Since 2004, he has been the spokesperson of his parliamentary group and president of the environmental commission.

References

1966 births
Living people
People from Ripollès
Republican Left of Catalonia politicians
General Secretaries of the Republican Left of Catalonia
Members of the Parliament of Catalonia
Ministers of Governance and Public Administration of Catalonia
Presidents of the Republican Left of Catalonia
Members of the 5th Parliament of Catalonia